Maknor is a village in the former municipality of Pezë in Tirana County, Albania. At the 2015 local government reform, it became part of the municipality Tirana.

References

Populated places in Tirana
Villages in Tirana County